Gladstone Dock railway station was a station in Bootle, Lancashire, England, located on the North Mersey Branch. Situated west of Rimrose Road (A565) within the Mersey Docks and Harbour Board Estate, it was named after the nearby Gladstone Dock.

History
It opened on 7 September 1914 and closed on 7 July 1924.

Although closed to passengers, the line remained in use for freight up until 1971. However, the embankment on which the single platform station was situated has long since been demolished. There is no evidence of the station's existence, as the site is within what is now the Royal Seaforth Dock.

References

Gladstone Dock railway station at Disused Stations

Disused railway stations in the Metropolitan Borough of Sefton
Former Lancashire and Yorkshire Railway stations
Railway stations in Great Britain opened in 1914
Railway stations in Great Britain closed in 1924